Amayak Arutyunovich Akopyan; born 1 December 1956, Moscow, USSR) is a Soviet and Russian illusionist, actor, circus artist. Ethnic Armenian. Presidential Decree awarded the honorary title Honored Artist of Russia. The son of the famous magician  and his wife Liya, opera singer. In the movies, originally played jugglers, then switched to the characteristic roles. He is best known for roles in Frenzied Bus (1990) and The Master and Margarita (1994).

Akopyan graduated from the film directing department of GITIS.

In 1996–2001, he was the host of the TV program Good Night, Little Ones! (as Rakhat Lukumych).

References

External links
 
 Боксёр и Звезда 
 Трагическая судьба Амаяка Акопяна 

1956 births
Living people
Male actors from Moscow
Soviet male film actors
Russian male film actors
Soviet circus performers
Soviet television presenters
Russian television presenters
Soviet magicians
Russian magicians
Honored Artists of the Russian Federation
Russian Academy of Theatre Arts alumni
Russian people of Armenian descent